The Peel Forest Park Scenic Reserve is a  forest reserve in the Canterbury region in the South Island of New Zealand. It is located near the Rangitata River and is in the foothills of the Southern Alps. The park is managed by the Department of Conservation as a scenic reserve, not a forest park.

Etymology
The forest was named by Francis Jollie, who settled in the area in late 1853. Jollie had named the forest after Sir Robert Peel, the British Prime Minister of the United Kingdom who had died in 1850, the year that Canterbury was founded. The adjacent mountain and the nearby community of Peel Forest also took Peel's name.

Flora and fauna
The Peel Forest is the remnant of a large Podocarpaceae forest. The three major tree types are the kahikatea (white pine), tōtara and matai (black pine). Logging reduced the forest to its current size. For his lengthy botanical study of Mount Peel, Harry Allan was awarded a Doctor of Science in 1923.

The forest is also home to many birds including kererū, fantail (pīwakawaka), and tomtit (miromiro).

Activities
Tramping is a popular activity in the park. There are several short walks, tramps, and one longer route that leads to the summit of Little Mount Peel.

See also
Forest parks of New Zealand
Protected areas of New Zealand
Conservation in New Zealand
Tramping in New Zealand

References

External links
Peel Forest Park  at the Department of Conservation

Parks in Canterbury, New Zealand
Protected areas established in 1909
1909 establishments in New Zealand